The flag of the Kingdom of Araucanía and Patagonia is described by some sources as green-blue-white and by other sources as blue-white-green. The flag was designed by Orélie-Antoine de Tounens.

The green-blue-white variant of the flag was probably only hoisted by Orélie in Araucania for some weeks. The blue-white-green version was designed by Orélie in exile in France and is still used by pretenders to the throne after his death.

Flags

References

Araucanía and Patagonia, Kingdom
Araucanía and Patagonia, Kingdom